The Smart Set was an American literary magazine, founded by Colonel William d'Alton Mann and published from March 1900 to June 1930. Its headquarters was in New York City. During its Jazz Age heyday under the editorship of H. L. Mencken and George Jean Nathan, The Smart Set offered many up-and-coming authors their start and gave them access to a relatively large audience.

Following a dispute over an unprinted article by Mencken and Nathan mocking the national grief over President Warren G. Harding's death, the two co-editors departed the publication to create The American Mercury in 1924. Within a year of their departure, owner Eltinge Warner sold the publication to press mogul William Randolph Hearst. Although circulation increased under Hearst's ownership, the magazine's content declined in quality. Following the Wall Street Crash of 1929, the magazine was unable to survive the economic slump and ceased publication in June 1930.

Half a decade after its dissolution, critic Louis Kronenberger hailed The Smart Set in The New York Times Book Review as one of the greatest literary publications due to its influence over American culture during its brief existence. "You were very conscious that it was making literary history," Kronenberger wrote, "it was teaching a literary America that went about on all fours how to walk."

Early years 

In 1900, American Civil War veteran and financier Colonel William d'Alton Mann sought to offer a cultural counterpart to his gossip magazine Town Topics, an infamous publication which he used for political and social gain among New York City's elite. Mann purportedly used his Town Topics investigators to gather embarrassing information about wealthy individuals in New York Society and would allow these individuals to suppress the articles in exchange for monetary remuneration.  This questionable practice led many historians to suggest the latter magazine functioned more or less as a means for Mann to collect blackmail:

When conceiving his new publication entitled The Smart Set, Mann wished to include works "by, for and about 'The Four Hundred'," referring to Ward McAllister's claim that there were only 400 fashionable people in New York's upper society. As a so-called "pasha of the Gilded Age," Mann sought to provide sophisticated content that would reinforce the social values of New York's social elite. As such, Mann initially sought out those writers who were supposedly "from the ranks of the best society of Europe and America." Mann gave his new publication the subtitle "The Magazine of Cleverness."

Mann published the first issue of The Smart Set on March 10, 1900, under the editorship of young poet Arthur Grissom, who had also worked on Town Topics. As editor, Grissom created the formula of the magazine that would remain intact throughout the greater part of its existence: 160 pages containing a novelette, a short play, several poems, and witticisms to fill blank spaces. Its first cover, by Kay Womrath, "depicted a dancing couple in evening dress controlled by strings held by a grinning Pan; the slashing S's of the title were in vermilion. The price was twenty-five cents." Its earliest contributors included celebrated poets Ella Wheeler Wilcox, Bliss Carman and Clinton Scollard.

Grissom was the first editor to publish works by O. Henry in The Smart Set, and O. Henry's short story, The Lotos and the Bottle, was published by Grissom "at the bargain rate of fifty dollars" in cash. However, after a very brief tenure as editor, Grissom died of typhoid fever in December 1901, and novelist Marvin Dana took over as editor, in the first of a series of managerial turnovers that would define the evolution of magazine until its termination. Dana formed an editorial triumvirate consisting of himself and two associate editors, Charles Hanson Towne and newspaper correspondent Henry Collins Walsh. 

Dana remained as editor until 1904, when he left The Smart Set to work in newspapers. Dana's chosen successor was Towne, previously an editor at Cosmopolitan Magazine. Towne was the magazine's first editor to actively push to publish new literary talents such as James Branch Cabell. He also oversaw a stable of famous contributors such as Jack London, Ambrose Bierce and Theodore Dreiser. Under Towne's editorship, the Smart Set honed its tone and content:

By 1905, the magazine reached its peak circulation of 165,000. However, as a result of allegations of blackmail associated with Mann's Town Topics in 1906, The Smart Sets popularity began to precipitously decline, and it immediately lost around 25,000 readers. Dissatisfied with the magazine's direction, Towne resigned his position as editor in 1908 to work with Theodore Dreiser on The Delineator, an American women's magazine.

After Towne's departure, Colonel Mann stepped up as editor alongside Fred Splint, and the two quickly set out to revitalize the magazine in order to rebuild its readership. As part of this revitalization, Mann started a monthly book review column and, in 1908, Splint hired the Baltimore newspaperman Henry Louis Mencken to fill the book reviewer position at the suggestion of editorial assistant Norman Boyer. The twenty-eight-year-old Mencken quickly became quite popular with readers as his "oracular, pungent, and racy" book reviews garnered much attention. Using his position as book reviewer for The Smart Set, Mencken would become "America's most important literary and social critic."

Soon after, in 1909, George Jean Nathan became the magazine's drama columnist. During his tenure as the Smart Set'''s resident theater critic, Jean "would become an extremely influential figure in the New York drama scene." Nathan "matched Mencken in his defiance of conventional mores, his saucy style, [and] his magisterial attitude." Together, the combined criticisms of Mencken and Nathan elevated the substantive content of Mann's magazine to appeal to intellectuals and ensured the magazine's place in literary history.

 Thayer years 

With The Smart Set in perpetual decline, Mann sold the magazine in Spring 1911 to John Adams Thayer for $100,000. Thayer was a self-made millionaire who had "made a personal fortune as a successful advertising manager at the Ladies' Home Journal." 

Thayer, who previously pulled the muckraking Everybody's Magazine out of a slump and earned himself a significant fortune from its sale, hoped ownership of The Smart Set would allow him entrance into the social ranks of New York's high society. However, the magazine's ruined reputation made this difficult and his purchase left him in charge of a sinking ship.

After Mencken and Nathan both declined the offer of editorship, Thayer assumed the position of editor-in-chief and appointed the magazine's associate editor, Norman Boyer, as managing editor. An expert in advertising, Thayer added a slogan to the magazine's subtitle, stating that "Its Prime Purpose is to Provide Lively Entertainment for Minds That Are Not Primitive." The new slogan was unsuccessful in restoring the magazine's reputation and popularity, but in 1912 a younger, more rebellious audience began reading The Smart Set for that very reason. To accommodate this new demographic, Thayer, at the recommendation of Mencken, handed over the editorship to Willard Huntington Wright in 1913. Wright was a Harvard graduate and had served as the literary editor of The Los Angeles Times. Wright outlined the magazine's new editorial direction in the next month's issue:

Although only lasting a year, Wright's tenure marked a period of artistic prosperity for The Smart Set. Thayer appointed Wright as editor with complete control of the magazine's content and direction. Wright, immediately taking advantage of this position, began collecting manuscripts from new artists and hired Ezra Pound as an overseas talent scout. With an appreciation for new and unconventional literary styles, Wright steered the magazine into publishing more experimental and avant-garde literary works by authors such as D.H. Lawrence, Joseph Conrad, William Butler Yeats, and Ford Madox Ford.

Predictably, Wright's editorial decision caused a drastic reduction in readership and angered the magazine's advertisers, who began withdrawing financial backing. Additionally, Wright was using The Smart Sets checkbook to overpay authors for their work and was attempting to secretly fund a prototype of a more radical publication with Mencken. As a result, Thayer fired Wright in 1914 and announced an end to the magazine's avant-garde content and a return to more traditional material. By the end of Wright's editorship, however, the magazine was in economic disrepair, and Thayer handed over ownership to Colonel Eugene Crowe in return for forgiveness of debts.

Nevertheless, due to the fired Wright's editorial decisions, the magazine had acquired a new intellectual audience. Its readership included such notable writers as Sinclair Lewis, Theodore Dreiser, Hugh Walpole, F. Scott Fitzgerald, and Ernest Hemingway, as well as college professors such as Stewart Sherman and Percy Boynton. The magazine also had garnered the attention of a number of critics and journalists, including Burton Rascoe, Edmund Wilson, Alfred Kazin, Franklin Pierce Adams and Harold Ross, the co-founder of The New Yorker magazine who was inspired to create the latter publication upon the demise of The Smart Set.

 Mencken and Nathan years 

Having little interest in running a magazine, Crowe gave control of The Smart Set to Eltinge Warner, who then appointed Mencken and Nathan as co-editors with total artistic control. Warner remained in control of the magazine's accounts—circulation, advertising, and bookkeeping—while Mencken and Nathan focused on literary content.

In a series of measures to economize, Mencken and Nathan relocated the magazine's office to a smaller location and reduced the staff, retaining only themselves and a secretary, Sara Golde. Additionally, Warner reprinted previous issues of The Smart Set under the title Clever Stories. In their most successful effort to boost revenue, Mencken and Nathan began the pulp magazine The Parisienne in 1915 as a place to publish a surplus of manuscripts they deemed inferior for The Smart Set. The Parisienne "capitalized on the then current war interest in France" generated significant profits, which they used to offset the production costs of The Smart Set. The co-editors sold The Parisienne to Warner and Crowe in 1916 and repeated the process with Saucy Stories and, in 1920, Black Mask.

Mencken and Nathan's co-editorship helped to bring about a golden era for new literature and The Smart Set.  Together, they "created a uniquely liberated mass-market venue for American fiction; this fact alone suggests the importance of this magazine in relation to American literary developments in the teens and early twenties." Circulation during their co-editorship was between 40,000 and 50,000, making it one of the most widely read literary publications. 

During this time the magazine featured works by Edna St. Vincent Millay, Theodore Dreiser, Aldous Huxley, Sinclair Lewis, Benjamin De Casseres, Eugene O'Neill and Dashiell Hammett, among others. Millay's short story "Barbara on the Beach" appeared in November 1914. In May 1915 The Smart Set published two stories from James Joyce's Dubliners, the first time Joyce's work appeared in an American publication. The magazine introduced F. Scott Fitzgerald in September 1919, when it published his short story Babes in the Woods. In addition to introducing new literary talent, the two editors were renowned social critics, who lampooned virtually every facet of American culture. Although they were known for their satire, their increasingly controversial material became the reason for their departure from The Smart Set and would set in motion the end of the magazine itself.

Mencken and Nathan specifically cultivated a youthful readership who had grown increasingly restive and disillusioned with America in the aftermath of The Great War. During these years, "Mencken constantly exhorted his fellow critics and literary historians to provide realistic appraisals and re-evaluations of our [American] cultural past, which would then, he felt, influence the present."

Mencken and Nathan's editorship at The Smart Set came to an end after they planned to run a satirical piece on President Warren G. Harding following his death. Harding died in August 1923. His funeral procession involved transporting the body across the country from San Francisco to Ohio. The mainstream media began to sentimentalize the procession, to the dismay of Mencken and Nathan, who noticed a hypocritical change in the press's attitude. They planned to run a satirical piece on the president's funeral, treating the president in death as they did in life.

However, the magazine's printers noticed the piece and reported its contents to owner Eltinge Warner. Considering the piece to be a form of treason, Warner demanded that the editors remove it. "I don't give a damn what you thought of him," Warner stormed at Mencken and Nathan, "Harding was our President, after all." In a rage, Warner announced that he would sell the magazine within a year. Warner's removal of the satirical piece marked the end of the editors' carte blanche over the magazine's content, and they sought the freedom and control of their own publication. Upon leaving, Mencken and Nathan began a collaboration with the publishing magnate Alfred A. Knopf and started The American Mercury.

 Decline and demise 

Before leaving The Smart Set, Mencken and Nathan recommended Morris Gilbert to replace them as editor. Reportedly, Gilbert had no idea that Warner was planning to sell the magazine upon accepting his position as editor. Under the editorship of Gilbert, the magazine's attitude and content reverted to the days before Mencken and Nathan's—or even Wright's—time as editors. However, Gilbert's position as editor was short-lived. In 1924, Warner sold the magazine to the publishing tycoon William Randolph Hearst, who immediately gave editorial control to George D'Utassey. Unable to cope with the new management, Gilbert resigned soon after.

Hearst's ownership of the magazine brought about an editorial focus on commercialism and superficial moral themes. As the magazine's new editor, D'Utassey reversed the artistic headway that Mencken and Nathan had established for the magazine and changed the subtitle to "True Stories from Real Life." Under D'Utassey the magazine veered away from unconventional literature and satire. Although the content changed, Hearst's promotion of the magazine in other publications caused circulation to increase to 250,000 in 1925.

In 1929 the magazine merged with Hearst's newly acquired McClure's to form The New Smart Set, under the editorship of Margaret Sangster. Under Sangster, the magazine became a publication targeted towards young women and was given a new subtitle, "The Young Woman's Magazine." However, following the Wall Street Crash of 1929, the magazine was unable to survive the economic slump. It ceased publication in June 1930.

 Legacy 
In 1934, nearly half a decade after the publication's dissolution, some of the best pieces from the magazine's heyday were collected in The Smart Set Anthology, published by Reynal & Hitchcock. That same year, critic Louis Kronenberger hailed the magazine in The New York Times Book Review as one of the greatest literary publications due to its influence over American culture during its brief existence:

In 2007, Drexel University launched an online cultural journal titled The Smart Set. Drexel's journal shares some ideals with the original Smart Set'' and lists Owen Hatteras, a pen name used by H. L. Mencken and George Jean Nathan of the original journal, on its masthead, but its connection to Mencken and Nathan's magazine is unofficial.

Editorial tenures

List of contributing authors 

 Maxwell Anderson
 Sherwood Anderson
 Djuna Barnes
 Ambrose Bierce
 Bliss Carman 
 Willa Cather
 Theodore Dreiser
 Lord Dunsany
 F. Scott Fitzgerald
 Ford Maddox Ford
 Zona Gale
 Richard Le Gallienne
 Dashiell Hammett
 Ben Hecht
 O. Henry
 Aldous Huxley
 Robinson Jeffers
 James Joyce
 Harry Kemp
 D.H. Lawrence
 Sinclair Lewis
 Anita Loos
 Jack London
 Edna St. Vincent Millay
 Eugene O'Neill
 Dorothy Parker
 Ezra Pound
 John Reed
 Clinton Scollard
 Carl Van Vechten
 S.S. Van Dine
 Ella Wheeler Wilcox

Cover gallery

References

Citations

Bibliography

Further reading

External links 

 The Smart Set at The Modernist Journals Project: a cover-to-cover, searchable digital edition of 120 issues across ten years—from January 1913 (issue 38.4) through December 1922 (issue 69.4).  PDFs of these issues may be downloaded for free from the MJP website.
 The Smart Set at Internet Archive, various volumes (scanned books original editions color illustrated)
 Louise Brooks Studies: Smart Set Magazine
 Drexel University's new Smart Set
 The Smart Set essays from Old Magazine Articles

Defunct literary magazines published in the United States
Magazines established in 1900
Magazines disestablished in 1930
Magazines published in New York City
Progressive Era in the United States
1900 establishments in New York City
1930 disestablishments in New York (state)